Queens Pound River, a partly perennial river of the Tuross River catchment, is located in the upper ranges of the South Coast region of New South Wales, Australia.

Course and features
Queens Pound River rises on the northern slopes of the Kybeyan Range within Wadbilliga National Park, southwest of the locality of Yowrie and flows generally north and northwest, before reaching its confluence with the Wadbilliga River near the locality of Wadbilliga. The river descends  over its  course.

See also

 Rivers of New South Wales
 List of rivers of New South Wales (L–Z)
 List of rivers of Australia

References

External links
 

 

Rivers of New South Wales
South Coast (New South Wales)